List of Isolepis species — a cosmopolitan genus of flowering plants in the sedge family, Cyperaceae.

Species
The genus Isolepis contains around 70 recognised species, they include:

Isolepis alpina Hook.f.
Isolepis angelica B.L.Burtt
Isolepis antarctica (L.) Roem. & Schult.
Isolepis aucklandica Hook.f.
Isolepis australiensis (Maiden & Betche) K.L.Wilson
Isolepis basilaris Hook.f.
Isolepis beccarii (Boeckeler) Goetgh. & D.A.Simpson
Isolepis bicolor Carmich.
Isolepis brevicaulis (Levyns) J.Raynal
Isolepis bulbifera (Boeckeler) Muasya
Isolepis caligenis (V.J.Cook) Soják
Isolepis capensis Muasya
Isolepis carinata Hook. & Arn. ex Torr.
Isolepis cernua (Vahl) Roem. & Schult.
Isolepis congrua Nees
Isolepis costata Hochst. ex A.Rich.
Isolepis crassiuscula Hook.f.
Isolepis cyperoides R.Br.
Isolepis diabolica (Steud.) Schrad.
Isolepis digitata Nees ex Schrad.
Isolepis distigmatosa (C.B.Clarke) Edgar
Isolepis expallescens Kunth
Isolepis fluitans (L.) R.Br.
Isolepis gaudichaudiana Kunth
Isolepis graminoides (R.W.Haines & Lye) Lye
Isolepis habra (Edgar) Soják
Isolepis hemiuncialis (C.B.Clarke) J.Raynal
Isolepis hookeriana Boeckeler
Isolepis humbertii (Cherm.) J.Raynal
Isolepis humillima (Benth.) K.L.Wilson
Isolepis hystrix (Thunb.) Nees
Isolepis incomtula Nees
Isolepis inconspicua (Levyns) J.Raynal
Isolepis inundata R.Br.
Isolepis inyangensis Muasya & Goetgh.
Isolepis karroica (C.B.Clarke) J.Raynal
Isolepis keniaensis Lye
Isolepis kilimanjarica R.W.Haines & Lye
Isolepis lenticularis R.Br. 
Isolepis leptostachya Kunth
Isolepis leucoloma (Nees) C.Archer
Isolepis levynsiana Muasya & D.A.Simpson
Isolepis ludwigii (Steud.) Kunth
Isolepis marginata (Thunb.) A.Dietr.
Isolepis minuta (Turrill) J.Raynal
Isolepis montivaga (S.T.Blake) K.L.Wilson
Isolepis moseleyana (Boeckeler) Muasya
Isolepis namaquana Muasya & J.Viljoen
Isolepis natans (Thunb.) A.Dietr.
Isolepis nigricans Kunth
Isolepis oldfieldiana (S.T.Blake) K.L.Wilson
Isolepis omissa J.Raynal
Isolepis pellocolea B.L.Burtt
Isolepis pottsii (V.J.Cook) Soják
Isolepis praetextata (Edgar) Soják
Isolepis producta (C.B.Clarke) K.L.Wilson
Isolepis prolifera (Rottb.) R.Br.
Isolepis pseudosetacea (Daveau) Gand.
Isolepis pusilla Kunth
Isolepis ranko (Steud.) Vegetti
Isolepis reticularis Colenso
Isolepis rubicunda Kunth
Isolepis ruwenzoriensis R.W.Haines & Lye
Isolepis sepulcralis Steud.
Isolepis setacea (L.) R.Br.
Isolepis sororia Kunth
Isolepis stellata (C.B.Clarke) K.L.Wilson
Isolepis striata (Nees) Kunth
Isolepis subtilissima Boeckeler
Isolepis sulcata (Thouars) Carmich.
Isolepis tasmanica (S.T.Blake) K.L.Wilson
Isolepis tenuissima (Nees) Kunth
Isolepis trachysperma Nees
Isolepis varians Steud.
Isolepis venustula Kunth
Isolepis verrucosula (Steud.) Steud.
Isolepis victoriensis (N.A.Wakef.) K.L.Wilson
Isolepis wakefieldiana (S.T.Blake) K.L.Wilson

References

External links

Isolepis